American Italian Pasta Company (AIPC) was a pasta manufacturing company with corporate offices in Kansas City, Missouri, and plants in Excelsior Springs, Missouri; Columbia, South Carolina; Tolleson, Arizona; and Verolanuova, Italy. APIC was acquired by Ralcorp in 2010, ConAgra Foods in early 2013,TreeHouse Private Brands, Inc. in 2016 and Winland Foods in December 2022.

Brands
Anthony's (acquired 2001 from Borden)
Mueller's (acquired 2000 from Unilever)
Golden Grain (acquired 2003 from the Quaker Oats Company)
Heartland
Luxury (acquired 2001 from Borden)
Martha Gooch (acquired 2002 from Archer Daniels Midland)
Mrs. Grass (acquired 2001 from Borden)
Pennsylvania Dutch (acquired 2001 from Borden)
R&F (acquired 2001 from Borden)
Ronco (acquired 2001 from Borden)

References

External links

Economy of Columbia, South Carolina
Manufacturing companies based in Kansas City, Missouri
Manufacturing companies established in 1988
Companies based in Lombardy
Maricopa County, Arizona
American pasta companies